David Brophy may refer to:
 David Brophy (conductor) (born 1972), Irish conductor
 David Brophy (boxer) (born 1990), Scottish boxer
 David Brophy (historian), Australian historian